The Angolan Basketball League MVP Award, for sponsorships reasons named the Unitel Basket MVP, is an annual basketball award given out to the most valuable player of a given Angolan Basketball League season.

Winners

Awards by player

Winners by team

References

Basketball most valuable player awards
Angolan Basketball League